Carl Haworth (born July 9, 1989) is a Canadian professional soccer player who plays as a forward and right-back for Atlético Ottawa.

Club career

Early career
Haworth began playing soccer at the age of four with Barrie SC, where he would play all of his youth soccer.

Haworth spent his entire collegiate career at Niagara University where he made a total of 73 appearances for the Purple Eagles and tallied 35 goals and 21 assists. He was also named MAAC Rookie of the Year in 2008, and was on the MAAC All-Academic team in 2009, 2010 and 2011 as well as First team All-MAAC in 2010 and 2011.

Forest City London
During his time in college, Haworth also played for Forest City London in the USL Premier Development League. On January 17, 2012, Haworth was drafted in the fourth round of the 2012 MLS Supplemental Draft (58th overall) by Montreal Impact. Despite making appearances during preseason as well as two reserve league appearances, he never signed a contract with the club. After an unsuccessful trial with the Impact, Haworth rejoined Forest City London for the remainder of the 2012 season. He tallied five goals in seven appearances for FC London and led them to their first PDL title.

Ottawa Fury
Haworth would trial unsuccessfully with Harrisburg City Islanders near the end of the 2012 season. In 2013, Haworth joined Ottawa Fury for their final season in the PDL. He made 12 appearances and led the team with 12 goals and 12 assists. He was also named to the PDL All-Eastern Conference team.

On November 19, 2013, Haworth signed his first professional contract as he joined Ottawa Fury FC for their inaugural season in the NASL. He made his professional debut on April 12, 2014 in a 2–0 defeat to Fort Lauderdale Strikers.

After leading the team in scoring with 8 goals, Haworth was named the Fury's top player in the 2016 season. In November 2016, it was announced that Haworth would stay with the club as they moved to the United Soccer League for the 2017 season. Despite being injured for the first half of the 2017 season, he would appear playing in his 100th game for the club in September 2017. In November 2017, the Fury announced Haworth would remain with the club for the 2018 season. In November 2018, The Fury announced Haworth would return for a sixth season in 2019. After six seasons with the Fury, the club would cease operations for the 2020 season, making Haworth a free agent. He would be the only player to play for the club for its entire existence.

Indy Eleven
In December 2019, Haworth joined Indy Eleven ahead of the 2020 season. In November 2020, the club would confirm that Haworth would return for the 2021 season, his second with the club. In December 2021, the club announced that Haworth's contract had expired, ending his time with the club after two seasons.

Atlético Ottawa
In February 2022, Haworth returned to Canada and signed with Canadian Premier League side Atlético Ottawa. Ottawa won the regular season that year.

International career
Haworth was a member of the Canadian under-23 national team for their Olympic Qualifying Tournament in 2012. He made three appearances for the U23s.

Haworth received his first call-up to the Canadian senior team on November 4, 2016 for a friendly against South Korea.

Style of play
Haworth can play as a central forward or as a winger, a position he played regularly for the Fury under Marc Dos Santos, but has also appeared as a right-back. Anticipating a more central role after the arrival of Paul Dalglish, Haworth commented, "Growing up I always played centrally, it's something that comes naturally. For the wingers to be tucked in more and playing closer to goal, it definitely benefits me. I can make those runs in behind and have a little less of a defensive role, so I can save that energy for going forward".

Personal life
Haworth was born in Southport, Merseyside to an English mother and a Welsh father. At the age of one, he and his family moved to Barrie, Ontario.

Career statistics

Honours
Forest City London
USL PDL Champions: 2012

Atlético Ottawa
 Canadian Premier League
Regular Season: 2022

References

External links
Ottawa Fury FC bio
Niagara Purple Eagles bio

1989 births
Living people
Footballers from Southport
Sportspeople from Barrie
Soccer players from Simcoe County
English footballers
Canadian soccer players
English people of Welsh descent
Canadian people of English descent
Canadian people of Welsh descent
Canada men's international soccer players
Canada men's under-23 international soccer players
Association football forwards
Niagara Purple Eagles men's soccer players
FC London players
Ottawa Fury (2005–2013) players
Ottawa Fury FC players
Indy Eleven players
Atlético Ottawa players
Canadian expatriate soccer players
Canadian expatriates in the United States
Expatriate soccer players in the United States
CF Montréal draft picks
USL League Two players
North American Soccer League players
USL Championship players
English expatriate sportspeople in Canada
Expatriate soccer players in Canada
English expatriate footballers